William Bates Greenough III (born January 3, 1932 in Providence, Rhode Island) is an American physician. He is a specialist in the treatment of diarrheal diseases such as cholera in the developing world. From 1986 to 1994, he was President of the International Child Health Foundation, which he co-founded. He is a fellow of the American College of Physicians and the American Association for the Advancement of Science.

Awards
In 1984 Greenough was awarded the King Faisal International Prize in Medicine for research on diarrhea with John S. Fordtran and Michael Field. For his services to children, UNICEF awarded him the Gold Medal for East Asia and Pakistan in 1983 and the Maurice Pate Prize in 1984. He was named the 2001 Howard Florey Memorial Lecturer at the University of Adelaide as well as the 2006 Paul G. Rogers Society Ambassador for Global Health Research. In 2007, he received the Outstanding Service Award from the Bangladesh American Foundation, Inc. In 2012, Greenough was awarded the Friends of Liberation War Honor Award by the prime minister and president of Bangladesh. He received the Mary Betty Stevens Award for Excellence in Clinical Investigation prize from the American College of Physicians in 2012, and the Arnold P. Gold Foundation Humanism in Medicine Award from the American Geriatric Society in 2014.

References

Biography articles needing translation from German Wikipedia
1932 births
Living people
20th-century American physicians
Harvard Medical School alumni